Ashta Someswaras refer to eight Shiva lingas ( consecrated in the eight directions (cardinal and inter-cardinal) around Draksharamam().

Etymology
Ashta in sanskrit means eight. Soma means moon. Eshwara refers to Lord Shiva. The name refers to eight lingas consecrated by the moon god.

Legend
According to Hindu faith the origin of temples is as follows. The linga in Draksharama has been consecrated by the sun God (Surya). This resulted in rise of atmospheric temperatures in the surrounding regions. To control these high temperatures, moon god (Chandra consecrated eight lingas in eight directions of Draksharamam.

Locations
With Draksharamam as reference point, the location of lingas is as follows:

 North: Vella
 South: Kotipalli()
 East: Kolanka
 West: Venturu
 North-East: Penumaalla
 North-West: Someswaram
 South-East: Dhangeru
 South-West: Korumilli

Religious beliefs
Dhraksharama linga along with these eight lingas together are known as Nava lingas. Visiting these Nava lingas on the same day is believed to be a holy act.

See also

 Shiva
 Lingam
 Draksharamam
 Hindu
 Pancharama Kshetras

References

External links
locations of ashta someswaras
brief video on ashta someswaras

Shaivism